Waterlife is a 2009 documentary film and web documentary about the state of the Great Lakes. It was directed by Kevin McMahon.

Film
McMahon began filming Waterlife in 2007. The film explores the beauty of the Great Lakes as well as their degradation due to water pollution. The film looks at the water system from its headwaters in Lake Superior to the Gulf of St. Lawrence, accompanied by Josephine Mandamin, an Anishinabe elder from Thunder Bay, who walks along the Great Lakes each spring to protest deteriorating conditions.

Waterlife is co-produced by Primitive Entertainment and the National Film Board of Canada (NFB). The film received the Special Jury Prize for Canadian Feature at the 2009 Hot Docs Canadian International Documentary Festival. The United Kingdom distributor is Dogwoof Pictures.

Web documentary
The interactive version of Waterlife was created by Toronto-based web and design company Jam3 and creative directors Adrian Belina and Pablo Vio for the NFB, incorporating material from the documentary film. The conception and development of the website took approximately four months. Waterlife explores different aspects of the state of the Great Lakes through 23 individual sections, incorporating text, images and sound. It received the Webby Award for best web documentary (individual episode).

See also
The Rise and Fall of the Great Lakes, a 1968 NFB film about the Great Lakes
 Water on the Table

References

External links
 (requires Adobe Flash)

National Film Board of Canada web documentaries
Great Lakes
Documentary films about water and the environment
Canadian environmental websites
2009 documentary films
Webby Award winners
Water pollution in Canada
Water pollution in the United States
2009 films
2000s English-language films
2000s Canadian films